Duran Martin (born 11 March 1996) is an Antiguan international footballer who plays club football for Thame United as a midfielder.

Club career

Early career
Martin played as a youth footballer for Oxford United before two spells at both Old Woodstock Town and Banbury United.

Corby Town
In September 2016 he joined Corby Town.

Gosport Borough
In January 2017 he signed for Gosport Borough.

Banbury United (third spell)
In the summer of 2017 he re-joined Banbury United.

Thame United
In the summer of 2018 he signed for Thame United.

International career
He made his international debut for Antigua and Barbuda in 2016 on 23 March in a Caribbean Cup Qualifying match against Aruba.

References

External links
 NFT Profile

1996 births
Living people
Footballers from Oxford
Antigua and Barbuda footballers
Antigua and Barbuda international footballers
English footballers
English sportspeople of Antigua and Barbuda descent
Banbury United F.C. players
Corby Town F.C. players
Gosport Borough F.C. players
Association football midfielders
Kidlington F.C. players
Thame United F.C. players
Oxford United F.C. players